Kokomo Creek may refer to:

 Kokomo Creek a tributary of the Chatanika River, Alaska
 Kokomo Creek a creek in Hot Spring County, Arkansas
 Kokomo Creek (Indiana), a tributary of Wildcat Creek (Indiana)